Zhou Bingxu (born 28 January 1995) is a Chinese footballer currently playing as a forward for Wuxi Wugou.

Club career
Zhou Bingxu would play for the Dalian Shide Youth Training team and participated in the Chinese University Football League before joining second tier football club Shaoxing Keqiao Yuejia. He would go on to make his debut in a league game on 18 March 2018 against Wuhan Zall in a 3-2 defeat. He would unfortunately be part of the team that was relegated to the third-tier after the club failed to apply for a League One license, despite finishing 12th in the 2018 China League One season.

He would join third tier club Lhasa Urban Construction Investment before joining second tier club Meizhou Hakka and would make his debut in a league game on 13 September 2020 against Liaoning Shenyang Urban in a 2-0 victory. Gaining very little playing he would be loaned out to Sichuan Minzu before joining Wuxi Wugou on 23 May 2022.

Career statistics
.

References

External links
Zhou Bingxu at Worldfootball.net

1995 births
Living people
Chinese footballers
Association football forwards
China League One players
China League Two players
Meizhou Hakka F.C. players